In politics, a national assembly is either a unicameral legislature, the lower house of a bicameral legislature, or both houses of a bicameral legislature together. In the English language it generally means "an assembly composed of the representatives of the nation." The population base represented by this name is manifestly the nation as a whole, as opposed to a geographically select population, such as that represented by a provincial assembly. The powers of a National Assembly vary according to the type of government. It may possess all the powers of government, generally governing by committee, or it may function solely within the legislative branch of the government.

The name also must be distinguished from the concept. Conceptually such an institution may appear under variety of names, especially if "national assembly" is being used to translate foreign names of the same concept into English. Also, the degree to which the National Assembly speaks for the nation is a variable. To achieve a quorum, the ancient Athenian Assembly employed Scythian police to arrest citizens at random from the street. On the other hand, the early Parliaments of Europe were mainly of an aristocratic composition. The word had its origins and inspirations from the National Assembly that was responsible for drafting a constitution during the French Revolution.

The exact words, "national assembly," have been used prolifically in the international community of nations since the 18th and 19th centuries, considered the Age of Revolution in western Europe. Nations that formed republics in this age subsequently formed empires. Extensive cross-cultural influences brought much of their language and institutions to the provinces. When these empires collapsed finally, the emancipated countries formed states and other institutions on the model of the former imperial nations. Some examples of international influences are as follows:

In Germany, a Nationalversammlung was elected following the revolutions of 1848–1849 and 1918–1919, to be replaced by a permanent parliament (Reichstag) later. The legislature of the Estado Novo regime in Portugal was known as the National Assembly. The national assembly was also defined in the Republic of China constitution. This is different from the Legislative Yuan by the ROC constitution. In 2005, Taiwan revised the constitution and the national assembly was abolished. Examples have multiplied greatly under the policy of self-determination adopted by the western nations. Many more are to be found in the articles listed below.

Origin of the expression 
Perhaps the best known National Assembly was that established during the French Revolution in 1789, known as the Assemblée nationale. Consequently, the name is particularly common in Francophone countries. It was also the name of the legislature during France's Second Republic and the Third Republic, and since 1946 has been the lower house of the French parliament, first under the Fourth Republic, and from 1958, the Fifth Republic.

The expression, however, did not originate in 1789. It was already in use in the French language of the times. Louis XIII of France (1601–1643), par la grace de Dieu Roy de France & de Navarre, in a Declaration of April 14, 1627, concerning the sovereignty of his kingdom, prohibits ministers of foreign countries from any jurisdiction in France, citing, as precedent, his Lettres de Declaration of April 17, 1623, forbidding religious officials from treating with foreign countries. He describes his Declaration as ordonné qu'en Assemblées Provinciales & Nationales des nosdites sujets. This was the "registration" that the Parlement of Paris refused to perform for Louis XVI of France in 1787–1788. When the Estates-General of 1789 formed the National Assembly of 1789, they did not believe they were instituting anything new. In the Assembly of Notables of 1787, Gilbert du Motier, Marquis de Lafayette had used National Assembly and Estates General synonymously when he suggested that France needed a national assembly to solve its financial problems.

National Assembly is also found in some Commonwealth countries. Its use there is not a translation of Assemblée nationale, as the phrase is equally embedded in the English language. For example, at the end of the First English Civil War, an Act of Parliament, 1648, "Concerning the Members of the Classical and Congregational Presbyteries, in the several counties of the Kingdom of England, and Dominion of Wales," establishes a national congregational church in England and Wales, corresponding to the presbyteries of Scotland. The language is: "The National Assembly shall be constituted of members chosen by and sent from the several Provincial Assemblies." This National Assembly appears to have no direct link to any French words, although the concept is the same.

Unicameral national legislatures

Lower house of bicameral national legislature

Upper house of bicameral national legislature

Entire bicameral legislature

Historical

Other historical

Other

See also 
List of national legislatures

Notes

References 

Legislatures